This is a list of museums (including art museums or art galleries) in Estonia.

See also
List of museums

References

External links

Museums
 List
Estonia
Museums
Museums
Estonia